Joseph Henry Hisbent (29 December 1881 – March 1953) was an English professional footballer who played as a right back in the Football League for Middlesbrough and Aston Villa.

Personal life 
Along with some of his Middlesbrough teammates, Hisbent enlisted in the 12th (Service) Battalion of the Yorkshire Regiment during the First World War. He held the rank of corporal and later served in the Worcestershire Regiment.

Career statistics

References

1881 births
1953 deaths
Military personnel from Plymouth, Devon
Footballers from Plymouth, Devon
English footballers
Association football fullbacks
Green Waves F.C. players
Aston Villa F.C. players
Portsmouth F.C. players
Brentford F.C. players
Darlington F.C. players
Middlesbrough F.C. players
English Football League players
Southern Football League players
British Army personnel of World War I
Worcestershire Regiment soldiers
Brentford F.C. wartime guest players

Green Howards soldiers